Maria do Carmo Carvalho Rebelo de Andrade (born 20 August 1984, in Lisbon), better known as Carminho, is a Portuguese fado and popular music singer. She comes from a family of musicians, since her mother, Teresa Siqueira, was a famous fado singer. She is considered one of the most talented and innovative fado singers of her generation. She can be considered as a crossover artist, since her eclectic work shows the heritage of both traditional and contemporary fado, as she also delves into other genres such as Brazilian popular music.

Carminho earned stardom status in Spain after being featured on Pablo Alborán's "Perdóname" which was a number-one single in the Spanish charts. Carminho's albums Fado and Alma have achieved Platinum and Gold status in Portugal selling more than 50,000 copies combined.

Discography

Studio albums

Singles

As featured artist

Performances
Carminho performed at WOMADelaide in 2014. Carminho performed on June 23, 2016 at the Gibraltar World Music Festival in St. Michael's Cave.

References

External links
Official website

1984 births
21st-century Portuguese women singers
Living people
Portuguese fado singers
Portuguese people of British descent
Singers from Lisbon